Madelyn Jane Curley (born December 3, 1981) is an American actress and former gymnast. She competed for the North Carolina Tar Heels. She was academic All American for four years.

She attended the University of North Carolina at Chapel Hill, where she belonged to the Alpha Chi Omega sorority.

Curley played gymnast Mina Hoyt in the 2006 film Stick It.

Curley stars in the 2016 gymnastics movie Chalk It Up.

In the 2019 film Terminator: Dark Fate, Curley served as both the body double and stunt double for a younger Sarah Connor in flashback scenes. CGI was used to recreate Linda Hamilton's facial likeness from the early 1990s.

External links
 
 IG Online Interview: Maddy Curley

1981 births
Living people
Actresses from Tallahassee, Florida
American film actresses
American female artistic gymnasts
American television actresses
Sportspeople from Tallahassee, Florida
21st-century American actresses
Leon High School alumni